Frank Thomas (5 April 1877 – 20 May 1924) was an English cricketer. He played for Gloucestershire between 1901 and 1906.

References

1877 births
1924 deaths
English cricketers
Gloucestershire cricketers
Cricketers from Bristol